The iShares S&P Global 100 Index Fund is an exchange-traded fund holding global stocks. The fund tracks the S&P Global 100 index.

The ticker symbol is IOO.

Top 10 holdings

 ExxonMobil
 Microsoft
 Procter & Gamble
 General Electric
 Nestlé N ORD
 IBM
 Johnson & Johnson
 HSBC
 JPMorgan Chase
 Chevron

(as of May 2010)

Competitors
Similar world stock funds are iShares MSCI ACWI Index (ACWI) and Vanguard Total World Stock Index ETF (VT). In the United States, these funds are not as popular as the ex-US funds such as iShares MSCI EAFE (EFA).

Statistics

The average market cap of the iShares S&P Global 100 is just a hair smaller than its relative iShares S&P 100 ($147bn versus $150bn as of December 2014). It also has higher alpha over the period 2011-2014.

See also 
 IShares S&P 100

References

External links
 Yahoo! Finance page for IOO
Bloomberg page for IOO:US
Reuters page for IOO

Exchange-traded funds